The Iranian Permanent Representative next the United Nations Office at Vienna is the official representative of the Government in Tehran next the 
 International Atomic Energy Agency (IAEA)
 United Nations Industrial Development Organization (UNIDO)
 United Nations Office on Drugs and Crime (UNODC)
 United Nations High Commissioner for Refugees (UNHCR)

in the Vienna International Centre.

List of representatives

See also
Atomic Energy Organization of Iran
Nuclear program of Iran
Scholars Pavilion

References 

Ambassadors of Iran to Austria
United Nations Office at Vienna
Iran